Zalman (זלמן) is a Yiddish-language variant of Solomon. The name was common among European Jews, and it still has usage in many Haredi and especially Hasidic communities all over the world.
Some of the founders of modern Israel bore this name, including Zalman Shazar, the third Israeli president. Nowadays this is not a common name in the modern secular Israeli circles, being identified as a diaspora name.

Zalman is also used as a surname, and it is especially common in Israel and the United States.

People 
 Shneur Zalman of Liadi, author of the Shulchan Aruch HaRav and Tanya. Also the founder of the Chabad Lubavitch movement and the oldest still operating charity organization in Israel Colel Chabad (established 1788). 
 Zalman Aran, Zionist activist, educator and Israeli politician (also Zalman Aranne)
 Zinovy Gerdt (born Zalman Khrapinovich), Soviet/Russian theatre and cinema actor
 Zalman Grinberg, Lithuanian/Israeli/American doctor, Holocaust survivor
 Zalman King, American film director, writer, actor and producer
 Zalman King's Red Shoe Diaries, TV series by the above
 Zalman Kornblit, Romanian Jewish playwright
 Zalman Teitelbaum, one of two Grand Rebbes of the Satmar Hasidim (full name Zalman Leib Teitelbaum or  Zalman Leib Yekusiel Yehudah Teitelbaum)
 Zalman Melamed, Israeli settler Rabbi (full name Zalman Baruch Melamed)
 Zalmen Mlotek, American conductor, composer, musician, and Artistic Director of the National Yiddish Theatre Folksbiene
 Zalman Moishe HaYitzchaki, Chabad-Lubavitch Rabbi (known familiarly as "Reb Zalman Moishe")
 Zalman Nechemia Goldberg, Israeli Rabbi
 Zalman Schachter, Polish-born American Rabbi (full name Zalman Schachter-Shalomi)
 Zalman Schocken, German Jewish, (later Israeli) publisher
 Zalman Shazar, President of Israel
 Zalman Shoval, Israeli politician and diplomat
 Zalman Shragai, Mayor of Jerusalem
 Zalman Sorotzkin, East European (later Israeli) Rabbi
 Zalman Usiskin, American mathematician
 Zalman "Zal" Yanovsky, Canadian rock musician
 Elijah ben Solomon Zalman, a Talmudist, halakhist, kabbalist
The compound "Shneur Zalman" is common among people of Hasidic Chabad affiliation, derived from their founder Shneur Zalman of Liadi.

See also
 Salman

References

Solomon
Yiddish words and phrases
Jewish masculine given names